Khan Bahadur Muhammad Siddique Memon (Sindhi: خانبهادر محمد صديق ميمڻ ; March 30, 1890 –  November 20, 1958) was an educationist, writer and social leader of Hyderabad, Sindh, Pakistan. He established "Madrasatul Banat" the first school of Sindhi Muslim girls in Hyderabad. He was founder of Sindhi Muslim Literary Society and Sindhi Muslim Printing Press. He authored more than 15 books including some text books. He served as Principal of Training College for Men, Hyderabad from 1940 to 1947. He was bestowed upon with the title of Khan Sahib and Khan Bahadur by the Viceroy of British India.

Childhood and education 
Muhammad Siddique Memon was born in Hyderabad, Sindh on 30 March 1890. His father's name was Muhammad Yousuf Memon. He got early education from Hyderabad and graduated from Aligarh Muslim University.

Contributions 
Muhammad Siddique Memon founded Sindhi Muslim Literary Society in Hyderabad in January 1931.  He served as Secretary and then President of this society. The purpose of this society was to promote Sindhi literature and to organize literary activities. To achieve these objectives, he founded Sindhi Muslim Printing Press to publish literary books. He published a number of books from this press. Under the platform of this society, he established the first Sindhi school for Muslim girls of Hyderabad. This school was named as Madrasatul Banat (Sindhi: مدرسته البنات). This is one of the most popular girls schools of Hyderabad. This school was opened on 1 April 1940. The foundation stone of the school was laid by Makhdoom Ghulam Hyder Siddiqui on 25 August 1940 and the Chief Guest was G.M. Syed, the then Education Minister of Sindh. In 1953, Muslim Girls Arts and Science College was also established with his efforts.

He authored more than 15 books including the following:
  (The kingdom of three days or the Peasant Government), 1932. (Sindhi: ٽن ڏينھن جي بادشاھي يا ھاريءَ جي حڪومت)
  (A Literary Gift), 1932. (Sindhi: ادبي تحفو)
  (History of Sindhi Literature) – two volumes,، 1937 & 1938.  (Sindhi: سنڌ جي ادبي تاريخ)
  (Islamic System of Education),1940. (Sindhi: اسلامي نظام تعليم)
  (Truth and Harmoney), 1943. (Sindhi: سچائي ۽ ھمت)
 , 1944. (Sindhi: خلافت راشديہ)
  (A textbook of Mathematics), 1947. (Sindhi: انگي حساب)
  (Translation from Persian), 1947. (Sindhi: بيگلار نامو)
  (History of Pakistan). (Sindhi: پاڪستان جي تاريخ)
  (History of Sindh). (Sindhi: سنڌ جي تاريخ)
  (Educational Psychology). (Sindhi: تعليمي نفسيات)
  (Essay Writing). (Sindhi: مضمون نويسي)
  (The Perfect Leader), 1949. (Sindhi: ڪامل رھنما)
 , 1951
  (History of England),1951. (Sindhi: انگلينڊ جي تاريخ)
 , 1951. (Sindhi: رسالو شاھ عبداللطيف ڀٽائي)
 Geometry (Sindhi: جاميٽري)

He was a famous teacher and expert of elementary Mathematics and Geometry. His books "Angi Hisab" (Mathematics) and "Geometry" were part of school curriculum for many years. He served as Principal of Training College for Men Hyderabad from 1940 to 1947.

He was nominated as a member of Central Advisory Board for Sindhi Literature by Sindh Government in 1941.

Awards 
In recognition of his services for promotion of education and social work, he was bestowed upon with the title of "Khan Sahib" and then "Khan Bahadur" (1946) by the Viceroy of British India.

Death 
He died on 20 November 1958 in Hyderabad Sindh.

References 

1890 births
1958 deaths
Sindhi-language writers
Sindhi people
Pakistani writers
Writers from Sindh
People from Hyderabad, Sindh
Social leaders